Murmur was a record label that started as an imprint of Sony Music Australia in mid-1994. Named after R.E.M.'s first album, Murmur signed a number of Australia's most successful rock bands, including Silverchair, Ammonia, Something for Kate and Jebediah. Notable alumni of Murmur include John O'Donnell, a former Rolling Stone journalist who became the head of EMI Australia, and John Watson, who runs a music management company and independent record label Eleven.

History
While the label was initially operated independently, it was eventually merged with Sony's head office in 1999. In 2007, Something for Kate, the label's only remaining act, released the final contractual album with Murmur.

Roster 1994–2007
Ammonia
Automatic
Beaverloop
B(if)tek
Bluebottle Kiss
Blueline Medic
Charlton Hill
Gilgamesh
Jebediah
Knievel
Lo-Tel
Silverchair
Something for Kate

Notes

See also
 List of record labels

Australian record labels
Alternative rock record labels
Record labels established in 1994
Record labels disestablished in 2007
Sony Music
1994 establishments in Australia
2007 disestablishments in Australia